The Sidna Allen House is a historic house located near the town of Fancy Gap, in Carroll County, Virginia. The house was built in 1911 for Sidna Allen, brother of Floyd Allen; however, he was arrested soon thereafter for complicity in the courthouse shooting of which his brother was accused, and never again lived there.

On January 27, 1901, when Sidna Allen was 35 years old he married Bettie Mitchell. After Sidna and Bettie married, they decided to build a house. According to the book The Courthouse Tragedy, the whole house was made of the best wood around, and there were eight rooms in the house. In the book it says, "The floors were of oak, except the floor of our living room, which was white maple." The walls in the house were all plastered. It also says, "In the dining room we used quarter-sawed oak, finished in natural color wainscoting." The roof of the house was made of slate, which back then, all this wood and other materials were very expensive. They had a windmill at the house, and an acetylene generator which is what provided them the lights. The house back in 1911 was worth $13,000.00. But a year later the Hillsville courthouse massacre occurred. Sidna and his wife had only lived there a year.

The house was added to the National Register of Historic Places in 1974.

The house is owned by the Carroll County Historical Society and is currently closed for restoration, donated by the Widener family, Bonnie Wood and Stanley Widener.

References

External links
 J. Sidna Allen House Website

Houses on the National Register of Historic Places in Virginia
Queen Anne architecture in Virginia
Houses completed in 1911
Houses in Carroll County, Virginia
National Register of Historic Places in Carroll County, Virginia
Museums in Carroll County, Virginia
Historic house museums in Virginia